Mihail Harnak (born 9 March 1989) is a retired Belarusian professional footballer.

External links

1989 births
Living people
Belarusian footballers
FC Partizan Minsk players
FC Belshina Bobruisk players
FC SKVICH Minsk players
FC Granit Mikashevichi players
FC Bereza-2010 players
FC Krumkachy Minsk players
Association football forwards